L'Aiguillon-la-Presqu'île is a commune in the Vendée department in western France. It was established on 1 January 2022 from the amalgamation of the communes of L'Aiguillon-sur-Mer and La Faute-sur-Mer.

See also
Communes of the Vendée department

References

Communes of Vendée
2022 establishments in France
States and territories established in 2022
Populated coastal places in France